Otto Struve A may refer to:
Russell (lunar crater)
Eddington (crater), on older maps